Information literacies are the multiple literacies individuals may need to function effectively in the global information society. These are distinct from the broad term information literacy.

Definitions 
The definition of literacy is "the ability to read and write". In practice many more skills are needed to locate, critically assess and make effective use of information. By extension, literacy now also includes the ability to manage and interact with digital information and media, in personal, shared and public domains.

Historically, "information literacy" has largely been seen from the relatively top-down, organisational viewpoint of library and information sciences. However the same term is also used to describe a generic "information literacy" skill.

New literacies and 21st century skills 

Towards the end of the 20th century, literacy was redefined to include "new literacies" relating to the new skills needed in everyday experience. "Multiliteracies" recognised the multiplicity of literacies, which were often used in combination. "21st century skills" frameworks link new literacies to wider life skills such as creativity, critical thinking, accountability.

What these approaches have in common is a focus on the multiple skills needed by individuals to navigate changing personal, professional and public "information landscapes".

Contemporary views  
As the conventional definition of literacy itself continues to evolve among practitioners, so too has the definition of information literacies. Noteworthy definitions include:

 CILIP, the Chartered Institute of Library and Information Practitioners, defines information literacy as "the ability to think critically and make balanced judgements about any information we find and use".
 JISC, the Joint Information Systems Committee, refers to information literacy as one of six "digital capabilities", seen as an interconnected group of elements centered on "ICT literacy".
 Mozilla groups digital and other literacies as "21st century skills", a "broad set of knowledge, skills, habits and traits that are important to succeed in today's world".
 UNESCO, the United Nations Educational, Scientific and Cultural Organization, asserts information literacy as a "universal human right".

Key information literacies 
The term information literacy covers many distinct fields, which are both distinct and interrelated. The following are key information literacies.

 Critical literacy
 Critical literacy is the ability to actively analyse texts and media to identify underlying messages, taking into account context, perspective and possible biases.

 Computer literacy
 Computer literacy is the ability to use computers and other digital devices efficiently enough to carry out basic or more advanced tasks.
 
 Copyright literacy
 Copyright literacy is the ability to manage creative output and make appropriate use of the work of others, informed by knowledge of copyright, ownership, usage and other rights.

 Data literacy
 Data literacy is the ability to gather, interpret and analyse data, and communicate insights and information from this analysis. Increasingly important in everyday life, over 80% of employers cite data literacy as a key skill for employees.

 Digital literacy
 Digital literacy is the ability to use technology to manage and interact with digitized information, participate in online practice and originate digital work.

 Disaster literacy
 Disaster literacy is an individual's ability to read, understand, and use information to make informed decisions and follow instructions in the context of mitigating, preparing, responding, and recovering from a disaster.

 Financial literacy
 Financial literacy is the capacity of an individual to understand available banking products, services, laws and obligations, and make informed decisions on financial assets.

 Health literacy
 Health literacy is the ability of individuals to locate, understand, manage, and make appropriate use of information to help promote and maintain good health.
  
 Media literacy
 Media literacy is the ability to locate, critically evaluate, communicate with and make effective use of different types of media.

 Transliteracy 
 Transliteracy combines capabilities in information literacy, technology, creativity, communication and collaboration, critical thinking, practical skills and craft, to cross cultures, contexts, technologies and media.

 Visual literacy
 Visual literacy is the ability to interpret and make meaning from visual information such as static or moving images, graphics, symbols, diagrams, maps.

 Web literacy
 Web literacy is the ability to navigate the world wide web, interact effectively and thrive online, while managing online presence, privacy and risk.

References 

Information science
Information society
Literacy